NIMD may refer to:

Netherlands Institute for Multiparty Democracy
National Institute for Minamata Disease (Japan)